Shashtiamsa (Sanskrit: षष्ट्यन्श) - meaning the 60th division, in Hindu astrology refers to the 60th division or  varga  of a  Rasi  or Sign equally divided or half-degree each. It is one of the sixteen shodasvargas that are considered important and relevant to important aspects of life. Virupas, a measure of planetary or bhava strength, are also known as Shashtiamsas.

Parasara’s explanation
In his Bṛhat Parāśara Horāśāstra, Parasara has defined the sixteen shodasvargas; with regards to the Shashtiamsa sub-division of a sign he states – ignore the sign position of a planet and take the degrees etc. it traversed in that sign. Multiply that figure by 2 and divide by 12, then, add 1 to the remainder which will indicate the sign in which the Shashtiamsa falls; the lord of that sign is the planet ruling the said Shashtiamsa. He has listed in a particular order the names of the sixty shashtiamsas falling in odd signs which order, he says, should be reversed for even signs. Planets in benefic shashtiamsas produce auspicious results while the opposite is true in case of planets in malefic shashtiamsas. In the context of varga classification he clarifies that the divisions falling in the planet’s exaltation sign, moolatrikona sign, own sign, and the signs owned by the lord of a kendra (angle) from the graha arudha are all to be considered as good vargas but not those divisions of a combust planet, defeated planet, weak planet and a planet in bad  avastha  situated wherein situated planets  destroy  yogas .

List showing names and order of Shashtiāmsās

Venkatesa’s interpretation
Venkatesa in his Sarvartha Chintamani (Slokas I.29 & 112) explains that planets occupying cruel Shashtiamsas (1/60th division of a sign) produce evil results, planets in good Shashtiamsas, and which planets are also occupying good vargas or divisions become powerful to confer good results and that planets in exaltation, in friendly signs, own navamsas , own rasis, drekkenas, shodasmsas and trimsamsas possess Sthanabala and exercise the most favourable influence. The same text also states that those planets that are exalted or occupy their moolatrikonas vested with full strength destroy all their good effects in case they happen to occupy cruel shashtiamsas. The lord of the 10th conjoining with the lord of the lagna in the 11th house causes loss of wealth through rulers’ ire if it also happens to be Yamaghantakansha or Danshtrakaralansha (which are cruel and evil shashtiamsas). The lord of the Dhanabhava (2nd house) even if occupying a kendrasthana or a  trikonabhava  does not confer wealth if it also occupies a cruel shashtiamsa, the person will incur debts; the same results will ensue in case the lord of the navamsa occupied by the lord of the 11th house is in a cruel shashtiamsa. Benefic planets occupying cruel shashtiamsas do not confer good results during the course of their respective dashas  or antra-dashas. Afflicted weak natural malefics situated in malefic shashtiamsa produce bad results. If at the time birth Saturn is in its sign of debilitation or in inimical sign or is eclipsed by the Sun and is associated with and aspected by planets and situated in a malefic shashtiamsa one meets a miserable death.  Saturn occupying its own sign or exaltation sign does not generally afflict the natural benefics or their yoga-formations, and if not occupying its neecha navamsa (Aries navamsa) or a cruel shashtiamsa confers good results.

Signification
The Birth Chart or Horoscope drawn for the time of birth verily indicates when events are bound to happen, and the Shashtiamsa Chart tells why events happen in the life of the native; both charts complement each other. Jataka Tattva tells us that the lord of the 10th house occupying evil vargas owned by evil planets and situated in cruel shashtiamsa makes one notorious. But, if the lord of the 10th associating with benefics is in the 5th shashtiamsa then he will be an able leader and ruler.

References

Technical factors of Hindu astrology
Sanskrit words and phrases